Otto Ole Schnellbacher (April 15, 1923 – March 10, 2008) was an American football safety and end in the National Football League (NFL) for the New York Giants.  He was a twice Pro Bowler. Also a professional basketball player, Schnellbacher played for the Basketball Association of America's Providence Steamrollers and St. Louis Bombers in 1948–49.

In college, Schnellbacher was a two-sport star at the University of Kansas, earning him the nickname "the double threat from Sublette".  On the gridiron, Schnellbacher, along with teammate Ray Evans, was KU's first football All-American in 1947.  That same season, Schnellbacher led the Jayhawks to a Big 6 conference title and an Orange Bowl berth.  Schnellbacher also excelled in basketball, where he was a four-time first-team all-conference selection (one of only three Jayhawks to do so).  He was a member of the 1943 Big Six conference championship team (which also featured All-American teammates Charles B. Black and the aforementioned Ray Evans) that is regarded as one of the program's greatest teams.

Schnellbacher died at the age of 84 from cancer.

BAA career statistics

Regular season

Playoffs

References

External links

Obituary at the Kansas City Star

1923 births
2008 deaths
American football defensive backs
American men's basketball players
Deaths from cancer in Kansas
Eastern Conference Pro Bowl players
Kansas Jayhawks football players
Kansas Jayhawks men's basketball players
New York Giants players
New York Yankees (AAFC) players
People from Sublette, Kansas
Providence Steamrollers draft picks
Providence Steamrollers players
St. Louis Bombers (NBA) players
Players of American football from Kansas
Basketball players from Kansas